Matville may refer to:

Matville, Ohio, an unincorporated community in Pickaway County
Matville, West Virginia, an unincorporated community in Raleigh County